Makrana Junction railway station is a railway station in Nagaur district, Rajasthan. Its code is MKN. It serves Makrana City. The station consists of 3 platforms. Passenger, Express, and Superfast trains halt here.

References

Railway stations in Nagaur district
Jodhpur railway division